Bradley Walsh (born 3 September 1996) is a former professional Australian rules footballer who played for the Carlton Football Club in the Australian Football League (AFL).

A solid inside midfielder from Rockingham, Walsh played colts (under-19) football for Peel Thunder, and played a handful of senior games for Peel as a teenager in 2013 and 2014. His onfield leadership as a junior was well regarded, and consequently he captained Western Australia at the 2014 AFL Under 18 Championships. Walsh also represented Western Australia at basketball as a junior.

He played most of the 2015 season with Carlton's , the Northern Blues, winning the VFL club's best and fairest award for the season, and he played three senior AFL games for the year, making his debut in Round 16, 2015. He was delisted in October 2015.

References

External links

1996 births
Living people
Carlton Football Club players
Peel Thunder Football Club players
Place of birth missing (living people)
Preston Football Club (VFA) players
Australian rules footballers from Western Australia